Dzheyrakh rural settlement - is a municipal entity, one of the five rural settlements in Dzheyrakhsky District in the Republic of Ingushetia, Russia.

The administrative center is rural locality (selo) Dzheyrakh.

Population

Administrative structure

References

Geography of Ingushetia